The Palshis are an ethnic community native to Mumbai, India, comprising priests of Prabhus who immigrated during the 13th century reign of Raja Bhimdev.

References 

Social groups of Maharashtra